Douglas Quentin Adams is a professor of English at the University of Idaho and an Indo-European comparativist. Adams studied at the University of Chicago, taking his PhD in 1972.  He is an expert on Tocharian and a contributor on this subject to the Encyclopædia Britannica.

He has also co-authored two works on Indo-European culture and languages with J. P. Mallory of the Royal Irish Academy. He is a Linguistics Editor at the Journal of Indo-European Studies, founded by Roger Pearson.  

At the University of Idaho, Adams teaches courses on linguistics, and grammar and semantics for the English as a Second Language program.

Works

References

Linguists from the United States
Living people
University of Idaho faculty
University of Chicago alumni
Year of birth missing (living people)
American academics of English literature
Indo-Europeanists
Linguists of Tocharian languages